Chanoch Henoch Eigis (1863–1941) was a prominent Lithuanian rabbi in the first half of the 20th century. He was one of the leading rabbis of Vilna for over 40 years, until he was killed in the Holocaust. He is chiefly known for a book of responsa entitled Marcheshet.

Life
Chanoch Henoch Eigis was born in Russian Lithuania in 1863. His father, Simcha Reuven, was a businessman and a scholar, the author of a number of works of Jewish thought. Chanoch was educated in Russian, Brisk and Kovno and finished his education in the world-famous Volozhin yeshiva. He married Hindy, the daughter of Rav Shmuel Dibretinsky.

In 1898, at the age of 34, Chanoch received an appointment as a rabbi in Vilna, a position he continued to hold until his death. Throughout his career he maintained a close, personal relationship with the leader of the ultra-orthodox community in Vilna, Rabbi Chaim Ozer Grodzinski and the two jointly signed numerous petitions, letters and announcements. The two rabbis jointly founded a kollel – a yeshiva for advanced rabbinic scholars who studied on their own –attended by many of the best talmudic students in Lithuania.

During the First World War Rabbi Grodzinski was forced to flee Vilna and Rabbi Eigis replaced him until he was able to return. When an argument arose concerning the identity of the government-appointed rabbi of Vilna, Rabbi Eigis opposed the candidate who supported the local Zionists, siding instead with the candidate supported by Rabbi Grodzinski, Rabbi Yitzhak Rubinstein. After the Balfour Declaration, Rabbi Eigis joined the Mizrachi, the religious Zionist organization. In 1923, Rabbi Eigis joined other Polish and Lithuanian rabbis and signed a proclamation supporting Mizrachi; however, in 1929 he stopped supporting the Mizrachi because of their support for an alternate candidate(ironically, the same Yitzchak Rubinstein from the earlier dispute, but this time for a different position) for the rabbinate of Vilna. Nonetheless, he continued to work in support of Aliyah (emigration of Jews to Palestine) and in 1935 he was one of the founders of the ultra-orthodox department of the Jewish National Fund.

After Rabbi Grodzinski's death in 1940, Rabbi Eigis was widely recognized as the senior rabbinic personality in Vilna and indeed in all of Lithuania. When the Second World War broke out, as a result of the Molotov–Ribbentrop Pact large numbers of yeshiva students streamed into Vilna from all corners of Lithuania. Rabbi Eigis worked tirelessly in support of these students, and many checks signed by him were sent by the "Joint". In 1941, at the age of 71, Rabbi Eigis was murdered by the Nazis. The date of his death in uncertain. There is testimony that he was killed on the 15th day of Elul (September 7); other reports state that he was killed 6 weeks earlier. The place of his death is also uncertain. Some reports indicate that he was killed in Vilna, while other reports indicate that he was first taken to Ponar, where he was killed by the Einsatzgruppen.

Works
Rabbi Eigis's first work,  entitled Minchat Chanoch, was added as an appendix to his father-in-law's work Olat Shmuel. The work deals with issues related to the tractates of Seder Kodashim and tractate Avodah Zarah. Eigis' most famous work are the books of responsa entitled Marcheshet, which deal both with practical and theoretical issues of Jewish law. The work was published in two parts, in 1931 and 1935. In the introduction to the book, Rabbi Eigis expresses his reservations regarding the so-called Brisker method of talmudic methodology. Indeed, Rabbi Eigis demonstrates great scholarship in the work, without the use of the analytical tools used by the Brisk school.

References

External links
Responsa "Marcheshet" at the site hebrewbooks.org
 Minchas Chanoch as part of Olat Shmuel vol 1 at site hebrewbooks.org

1863 births
1941 deaths
Lithuanian Haredi rabbis
19th-century Lithuanian rabbis
20th-century Lithuanian rabbis
Rabbis from Vilnius